"Faith" is the sixth episode in the fourth season of the re-imagined Battlestar Galactica. It first aired on television on May 9, 2008. The episode guest starred actress Nana Visitor, best known for her role as Kira Nerys on Star Trek: Deep Space Nine. The survivor count shown in the title sequence is 39,675.

Plot
The episode begins aboard the Demetrius, as Helo refuses to obey Captain Starbuck's orders to rendezvous with Leoben's Basestar. Starbuck tries to initiate the FTL jump herself, but is restrained by Athena. Helo tells Gaeta to initiate the jump to the fleet, but Anders prevents it by shooting Gaeta in the leg. Horrified by the outcome of the situation, Starbuck finally agrees that taking the Demetrius is too risky and will instead take a Raptor. Anders volunteers to go with her, along with Athena. Helo states the Raptor doesn't have enough fuel to return to the fleet, but Starbuck believes she can return with the Basestar. Helo gives her a 15-hour window before he returns to the fleet.

On Colonial One, President Roslin talks with her aide Tory Foster. She commends Tory, who has stepped up with more confidence in her duties. As Starbuck searches a Basestar graveyard, she finds a ringed gas giant with three stars and a comet. The comet being, to Starbuck's astonishment, Leoben's Basestar as it trails vapor behind it. Starbuck's Raptor collides with debris, and she is knocked unconscious. Starbuck awakens, finding herself inside a Basestar hangar bay. While Athena inspects the Raptor, she is approached by several copies of the Number Eight model. They explain that in their attempt to revolt, the Sixes only led them to disaster and they ask Athena to help lead a mutiny against them. Athena refuses to get involved and admonishes the copies about picking a side and staying with it.

Back on the Basestar, Leoben argues with a Six (Natalie) over allowing Starbuck to see the Hybrid. Starbuck sees no choice in the matter as both sides need to help each other. Athena interfaces with the Cylon computer and informs that the Basestar's FTL is damaged. The system can piggyback off the Raptor's FTL to navigate a jump back to the Demetrius, but the Hybrid will have to be disconnected.

Jean Barolay, preps the Raptor for the FTL link up, a copy of Six approaches and recognizes her as a resistance member back on New Caprica. The Six reminds Jean that she had murdered her, unprovoked, in cold blood. When Jean replies that she would be happy to do it again, the Six slams her head into the Raptor door frame, killing her. Infuriated, Anders forces the Six to the deck and holds a gun to her head. The Six known as Natalie asks her sister why she killed Barolay. The Six tells her of an incident on New Caprica when Barolay pushed her into a water treatment reservoir and did nothing but watch her drown, and that she could not get past it. Natalie reaches for the gun and while it is still in Anders' hands, she pulls the trigger herself.

Back on Galactica, Roslin talks again with Emily who apologizes for her earlier outburst. She tells Roslin that she doesn't agree with Baltar's political stance, but agrees with his religious beliefs saying that she feels a single loving presence from God just as Baltar describes it. She says she had a dream of standing on a ferry boat, crossing the river that Baltar says separates their world from the afterlife. Back on the Basestar, Starbuck finds the Hybrid, and listens to her strange rant of technical information and nonsensical statements. Athena and a Number 8 arrive to disconnect the Hybrid. A Centurion guarding the room quickly reacts and shoots the Number 8 in the ensuing confusion. As Kara and Athena disable the Centurion, the Hybrid tells Starbuck: "Thus shall it come to pass. The dying leader will know the truth of the opera house. The missing three will give you the five who have come from the home of the thirteenth. You are the harbinger of death, Kara Thrace. You will lead them all to their end. End of line."

Roslin explains that Baltar is speaking only of the Cylon God, but Emily believes he is the god of all and argues that the metaphysical stories of the Lords of Kobol are inconceivable. Roslin tearfully harkens back to when her mother was dying and how she believed Aphrodite would take her away, but in the end, there was nothing but darkness. Back on the Basestar, Natalie solves the Hybrid's riddle by answering that "the three" is a reference to D'anna, and that she knows who the final five Cylons are. The five have come from the 13th tribe and they will know where Earth is. Starbuck's team and the Cylons prepare to rendezvous with the Demetrius. Roslin has the dream that Emily described, and then awakens to find that Emily has died. Gaeta's health steadily declines, and he requests that Helo prevent Doctor Cottle from amputating his leg if it comes to that. Helo refuses to depart early, no matter the consequences to Gaeta. By the time that Starbuck's group has figured out their next move, the clock has run out and Helo prepares to jump back to the fleet. Suddenly, the Basestar appears right on top of them. Athena calls Helo and tells him they have successfully secured the Basestar. Roslin talks to Admiral Adama, discussing the shared dream which she had with Emily. Adama doesn't know what to make of it, and is more focused on Lee turning in his wings for a political career, and Starbuck's sudden reappearance from the dead. Knowing the Demetrius is overdue, Adama wonders if he will ever see Starbuck and her crew again. Roslin explains that she is with him now and that they will find Earth. Roslin asks why he now believes in Earth, and he replies, smiling, she made him believe.

External links
 "Faith" at Battlestar Wiki
 "Faith" at Syfy
 

2008 American television episodes
Battlestar Galactica (season 4) episodes